The following is a list of squads for all eight national teams that competed at the 2015 UEFA European Under-21 Championship. Each national team had to submit a final squad of 23 players, three of whom had to be goalkeepers. If a player was injured or ill severely enough to prevent his participation in the tournament before his team's first match, he could be replaced by another player.

Players in boldface were capped at full international level prior to the start of the tournament.

Age, caps, goals and club as of 17 June 2015.

Group A

On 25 May 2015, the Czech Republic named a 27-man provisional squad. On 7 June 2015, the final squad was announced.

Head coach: Jakub Dovalil

On 1 June 2015, Denmark named their squad. At the time, Jores Okore was in the selection, however Patrick Banggaard was named as a replacement, if Okore did not recover from his injury. The next day, Okore ruled himself out.

Head coach: Jess Thorup

On 26 May 2015, Germany named a 28-man provisional squad. The final squad was announced on 7 June 2015.

Head coach: Horst Hrubesch

On 29 May 2015, Serbia named their squad.

Head coach: Mladen Dodić

Group B

On 20 May 2015, England named a 27-man provisional squad. On 2 June 2015, they named their final squad. On 18 June 2015, Benik Afobe replaced the injured Saido Berahino.

Head coach: Gareth Southgate

On 1 June 2015, Italy named a 27-man provisional squad. On 7 June 2015, they named their final squad.

Head coach: Luigi Di Biagio

On 1 June 2015, Portugal named a 25-man provisional squad.

Head coach: Rui Jorge

On 2 June 2015, Sweden named their squad. On 15 June 2015, defender Emil Krafth was ruled out of the tournament after a back injury, being replaced by defender Victor Lindelöf.

Head coach: Håkan Ericson

Footnotes

References

Squads
UEFA European Under-21 Championship squads